Victoria Park is a public park located in Nuwara Eliya, next to the Nuwara Eliya Post Office in Sri Lanka. 

Originally the park was the research field of Hakgala Botanical Garden. The park was formally named in 1897 to commemorate Queen Victoria's Diamond Jubilee. The park was established with the planting of its first tree, an Oak, by a visiting German Princess. The Nanu Oya River runs through the park, creating a number of small lakes. A number of rare bird species can be found in the park. At the far end of the park is a small children's playground and miniature ridable railway.

See also
Victoria Park, Colombo

References

Urban public parks
Parks in Nuwara Eliya